Martin Carl Sofus Olsen (22 November 1894 – 9 July 1971) was a Danish boxer who competed in the 1920 Summer Olympics. He was born in Sundby, Copenhagen and died in Copenhagen. In 1920 he was eliminated in the quarter-finals of the middleweight class after losing his fight to Hjalmar Strømme.

References

External links
profile

1894 births
1971 deaths
Middleweight boxers
Olympic boxers of Denmark
Boxers at the 1920 Summer Olympics
Danish male boxers
Sportspeople from Copenhagen